First Baptist Church is a Baptist church located in Biloxi, Mississippi. It is affiliated with the Southern Baptist Convention.

History
The church was founded by the Rev. J.B. Hamberlin in 1875.

The church opened a 1,300-seat auditorium in 2000. In addition to a worship center, the campus has office space and numerous classrooms. It also hosts a full service kitchen in the fellowship hall.

The campus also has a youth center that consists of a lounge housing several 42" LCD televisions with various game consoles, an internet cafe a refreshment area, an auditorium, and several additional classrooms.

The church streams its sermons on its website and broadcasts on the local television station WLOX. All ministers occasionally visit schools for student counseling and fellowship. First Baptist has a tradition of a 120-person singing Christmas tree every December. The estimated membership of First Baptist Biloxi is 2,000

External links
 FBC Biloxi

References

Baptist churches in Mississippi
Churches in Harrison County, Mississippi
Buildings and structures in Biloxi, Mississippi
Southern Baptist Convention churches